Spencer Janney Bloch (born May 22, 1944; New York City) is an American mathematician known for his contributions to algebraic geometry and algebraic K-theory. Bloch is a R. M. Hutchins Distinguished Service Professor Emeritus in the Department of Mathematics of the University of Chicago. He is a member of the U.S. National Academy of Sciences and a Fellow of the American Academy of Arts and Sciences and of the American Mathematical Society. At the International Congress of Mathematicians he gave an invited lecture in 1978 and a plenary lecture in 1990. He was a visiting scholar at the Institute for Advanced Study in  1981–82. He received a Humboldt Prize in 1996. He also received a 2021 Leroy P. Steele Prize for Lifetime Achievement.

See also 
Bloch's formula
Bloch group
Bloch–Kato conjecture
Bloch's higher Chow group

References

James D. Lewis, and Rob de Jeu (Editors),  Motives and Algebraic Cycles: A Celebration in Honour of Spencer J. Bloch. Fields Institute Communications series, 2009,  American Mathematical Society.

External links
Spencer Bloch personal webpage, Department of Mathematics, University of Chicago

20th-century American mathematicians
21st-century American mathematicians
Algebraic geometers
Members of the United States National Academy of Sciences
Fellows of the American Academy of Arts and Sciences
Fellows of the American Mathematical Society
University of Chicago faculty
Columbia University alumni
Institute for Advanced Study visiting scholars
1944 births
Living people
Harvard College alumni
Mathematicians from New York (state)
Scientists from New York City